The 1989 NCAA Division I men's lacrosse tournament was the 19th annual Division I NCAA Men's Lacrosse Championship tournament. Twelve NCAA Division I college men's lacrosse teams met after having played their way through a regular season, and for some a conference tournament.

Tournament overview

The championship game was played at Maryland's Byrd Stadium in front of 23,893 fans. The game saw Syracuse University defeat Johns Hopkins University by the score of 13–12. This was a battle of #1 versus #2, with both teams coming into the finals with just one loss.

This was the second straight national title for Syracuse behind the Gait brothers, Paul and Gary Gait, as well as John Zulberti. In addition to the Gaits, a number of stars played in this final, including Dave Pietramala, Quint Kessenich, Tom Marechek.

A wild, back and forth, athletic affair, the game was not decided until one final desperation shot by John Dressel with two seconds left. Matt Palumb made the stop and finished the game with 13 saves. Paul Gait had 4 goals and 2 assists for Syracuse. Hopkins got the ball back for a final possession on a tremendous over the head check on Gary Gait by Dave Pietramala followed by a mad scramble with Hopkins securing the ball with 12 seconds remaining.

Tournament results 

(i) one overtime

Tournament boxscores

Tournament Finals

Tournament Semi-finals
 
 
Tournament Quarterfinals

Tournament First Round

References

External links 
 Title Game video from NCAA on Demand
 1989 Syracuse Men's Lacrosse Statistics

NCAA Division I Men's Lacrosse Championship
NCAA Division I Men's Lacrosse Championship
1989 in lacrosse
NCAA Division I Men's Lacrosse Championship